Moelwyn Bach is a mountain in Snowdonia, northern Wales and forms part of the Moelwynion. It is connected to its parent peak Moelwyn Mawr via the Craigysgafn ridge.

It overlooks the town of Blaenau Ffestiniog and the Vale of Ffestiniog.

References

External links
 www.geograph.co.uk : photos of Moelwyn Bach and surrounding rea

Ffestiniog
Llanfrothen
Mountains and hills of Gwynedd
Mountains and hills of Snowdonia
Hewitts of Wales
Nuttalls